South Korean girl group Blackpink have released two studio albums, three extended plays, four single albums, one compilation album, and four live albums in total.

Blackpink released their debut single album Square One in August 2016, which includes the songs "Whistle" and Boombayah". "Whistle" debuted atop the Circle Digital Chart (formerly Gaon Digital Chart) and sold more than 2.5 million digital copies in South Korea while "Boombayah" became the group's first number-one hit on the Billboard World Digital Song Sales chart. The group continued their success with the release of Square Two on November 1, 2016. The single album includes "Playing with Fire", which sold more than 2.5 million digital copies in South Korea and became Blackpink's second number-one hit on the Billboard World Digital Song Sales chart. Square Two peaked at number 13 on the Billboard Top Heatseekers chart and number two on the World Albums chart.

In June 2017, the group released their fifth single, "As If It's Your Last", which became the group's third song to reach 2,500,000 certified downloads in South Korea and their third number-one hit on the Billboard World Digital Song Sales chart (after "Boombayah" and "Playing with Fire"). In August of the same year, Blackpink made their Japanese debut with their EP Blackpink, which featured Japanese-language editions of the group's existing tracks at the time. The EP was a commercial success, debuting atop the Oricon chart and selling over 80,000 copies in Japan.

In June 2018, the group released their first Korean EP, Square Up, which debuted atop South Korea's Circle Album Chart (formerly Gaon Album Chart). Square Up peaked at number 40 on the Billboard 200, and spawned the hit single "Ddu-Du Ddu-Du", which spent three weeks atop the Circle Digital Chart. "Ddu-Du Ddu-Du" was also the group's first song to enter the Billboard Hot 100, debuting and peaking at number 55, and their fourth number-one on the World Digital Song Sales chart. As of April 2019, the single has achieved a platinum certification for both streaming and downloads within South Korea. In October 2018, the group collaborated with British singer Dua Lipa for the track "Kiss and Make Up", achieving commercial success worldwide. In December 2018, the group released their first Japanese studio album, Blackpink in Your Area, which included all tracks from their previous Japanese self-titled extended play as well as Japanese versions of the four tracks on Square Up.

The group's second Korean EP Kill This Love was released digitally on April 5, 2019. A physical version of the album was released later on April 23, 2019. The EP received positive reviews and was a commercial success, selling 250,000 physical copies in South Korea within the first eight days. Kill This Love peaked at number 24 on the Billboard 200, making them the highest-charting female Korean act on the chart. The EP's lead single, "Kill This Love," peaked at number 41 on the Billboard Hot 100, marking the group's third hit to enter the chart and extending their record for the most entries and longest-charting single of a female Korean act on the chart. It also became the group's fifth single to chart at number one on Billboard'''s World Digital Song Sales chart.

In June 2020, Blackpink released "How You Like That" as a pre-release single from the group's debut studio album The Album. The song spent three weeks atop the Circle Digital Chart and debuted at number 33 on the Billboard Hot 100, tying with the group's collaboration with American singer Lady Gaga, "Sour Candy", as the highest-charting songs by a female Korean act on the Hot 100. The group subsequently released the second pre-release single “Ice Cream" featuring American singer Selena Gomez on August 28, which peaked at number 13 on the Billboard Hot 100, becoming the highest-charting as well as the longest-charting song by a female Korean act on the chart. On October 2, 2020, The Album was released alongside title track “Lovesick Girls", which peaked at number two on both the Billboard Global 200 and the Circle Digital Chart. The album debuted at number one on the Circle Album Chart and broke the record for the best-selling album by a Korean female act of all time, selling over 1 million copies in its first month. It also debuted at number two on the Billboard 200, becoming the highest-charting album by a female Korean act and the highest-charting album by a girl group since 2008 on the chart.

On August 19, 2022, Blackpink released the pre-release single "Pink Venom" from the group's second studio album Born Pink, which peaked on the Billboard Global 200 for two weeks, their first number-one single. It also peaked at number two on the Circle Digital Chart and number 22 on the Billboard Hot 100. Born Pink was released on September 16, alongside title track "Shut Down", which was their second single to top the Billboard Global 200 and peaked at number three on the Circle Digital Chart and number 25 on the Billboard Hot 100. The album debuted at number one on the Circle Album Chart with 2.2 million copies sold in the first two days, breaking the record for the best-selling album by a Korean female act of all time. It debuted at number one on the Billboard'' 200, the first album by a female Korean act to do so and the first album by a girl group to do so since 2008. It also debuted at number one on the UK Albums Chart, becoming the first number-one album by a K-pop girl group.

Albums

Studio albums

Compilation albums

Live albums

Extended plays

Single albums

Singles

As lead artist

Promotional singles

Other charted songs

Footnotes

References

Discography
Discographies of South Korean artists
K-pop music group discographies